, Germanized as Ischi, is a Japanese yodeler active in Germany.

Biography

Ischi was born and raised in Tokyo, Japan. In high school, he was a loner, but it was during this time that he first heard yodeling on the radio. Following his father, Ischi went to university for mechanical engineering. In his spare time he became engrossed with the zither and the hammered dulcimer, and learned to play these instruments. Using Franzl Lang's records, he taught himself to yodel, and began performing on Japanese television. During a six-month period where he studied abroad in Germany, Ischi went to Switzerland, where he sang at a beer hall in Zurich. He soon started earning money from this. From there he sang in front of Franzl Lang (The Jodlerkönig), his idol, and Lang took him under his wing. He performed on television with Maria Hellwig, and after that became known in German language circles as the "Japanese yodeler"..

Ischi met his wife Henriette in 1981 and proposed to her three years later at an onsen (hot spring) in Japan, where he yodeled his proposal to her. They married in 1985 and had five children, four sons named Maximilian, Michael, Andreas and Lukas, and one daughter named Julia.

A collaboration with The Gregory Brothers, "Chicken Attack", was released on January 25, 2017, and has received over 20 million views on YouTube. In 2019, a cover featuring the Taiwanese metal band Chthonic was released.

Ischi collaborated with The Gregory Brothers again for a series that was released on January 17, 2020. The first song in their series is "Chicken Pig Attack", with more songs promised in the future. The next song in their series, "Rat Attack", was released on January 24, 2020, followed by "Cow Attack" on January 28, 2022.

In 2021, he had a guest appearance in Belgian reality TV series The Mole.

Discography
Der Küstenjodler
 Der Küstenjodler
 Wer hat nur Dir das Jodeln beigebracht
 Bockwurst, Bier und Blasmusik

New Bibi-Hendl
 New Bibi-Hendl (Rap)
 New Bibi-Hendl (Heimatsender-Mix)
 New Appenzeller
 New Bibi-Hendl (Extended Dance-Version)
 New Bibi-Hendl (Karaoke-Version)

Bockwurst, Bier und Blasmusik
 Bockwurst, Bier und Blasmusik
 Ich fang den Tag mit einem Jodler an
Wer hat nur Dir das Jodeln beigebracht
 Wer hat nur Dir das Jodeln beigebracht
 Bockwurst, Bier und Blasmusik
 Ich fang den Tag mit einem Jodler an

Der Import-Hit aus Japan
 Bibi-Hendl
 Der Import-Hit aus Japan
 Zwei Spuren im Schnee
 Appenzeller
 In jeder Sprache klingt es gleich
 Wer hat nur Dir das Jodeln beigebracht
 Der Liebes-Jodler
 Bergvagabunden
 Der Küsten-Jodler
 Bockwurst, Bier und Blasmusik
 Ich fang den Tag mit einem Jodler an
 Jagertee im Pulverschnee - gemeinsam mit Maria & Margot Hellwig
 Bibi-Hendl (Extended Dance-Version) (bonus track)

Die hr4-Weihnachts-CD
 Zwei Spuren im Schnee - Takeo Ischi

Edelweiss der Volksmusik - Volume 1
 Wer hat nur Dir das Jodeln beigebracht - Takeo Ischi

Festival der Volksmusik Volume 1
 Der Küstenjodler - Takeo Ischi

Schlager & Gute Laune Festival Die Hits von CD 2
 Takeo Ischi * New Bibi-Hendl (Rap)

Lieder die von Herzen kommen Volume 1
 Der Küsten-Jodler - Takeo Ischi

Maria Hellwig - Ich möcht so gerne Urgroßmutter sein
 Takeo Ischi - Der Küstenjodler

Trivia

Takeo Ischi was shown at the 9th season of the Belgian show De Mol in 2021. The candidates of this show played a challenge in which they recorded a videoclip with him, entitled Der Maulwurf (EN: 'The Mole') to earn money. This song described the behaviour of the mole in this show.

References

External links
 Rubin Records profile 
 Takeo Ishii's Official website 

Japanese folk singers
1947 births
Living people
Singers from Tokyo
Yodelers
20th-century Japanese male singers
20th-century Japanese singers
21st-century Japanese male singers
21st-century Japanese singers
Japanese expatriates in Germany
German folk singers
20th-century German male singers
21st-century German male singers